Duke of Fernán Núñez is a hereditary title of nobility in the Peerage of Spain accompanied by the dignity of Grandee. The Countship of Fernán Núñez granted in 1639 to Alonso Gutiérrez de los Ríos was elevated to a dukedom in 1817 in the person of Carlos José Gutiérrez de los Ríos, who became the 1st Duke of Fernán Núñez.

The name makes reference to the municipality of Fernán Núñez, in Cordoba, Spain.

Counts of Fernán Núñez (1639)

 Alonso Estacio Gutiérrez de los Rios y Angulo, 1st Count of Fernán Núñez
 Ana Antonia Gutiérrez de los Ríos y Quesada, 2nd Countess of Fernán Núñez
 Francisco Diego Gutiérrez de los Ríos, 3rd Count of Fernán Núñez
 Pedro Gutiérrez de los Ríos, 4th Count of Fernán Núñez
 José Diego Gutiérrez de los Ríos y Zapata, 5th Count of Fernán Núñez
 Carlos José Gutiérrez de los Ríos, 6th Count of Fernán Núñez
 Carlos José Gutiérrez de los Ríos y Sarmiento de Sotomayor, 7th Count of Fernán Núñez

Dukes of Fernán Núñez (1817)
 Carlos José Gutiérrez de los Ríos y Sarmiento de Sotomayor, 1st Duke of Fernán Núñez
 María Francisca de Asís Gutiérrez de los Ríos y Solís Vignancourt, 2nd Duchess of Fernán Núñez
 María del Pilar Ossorio y Gutiérrez de los Ríos, 3rd Duchess of Fernán Núñez
 Manuel Felipe Falcó y Osorio, 4th Duke of Fernán Núñez
 Manuel Falcó y Álvarez de Toledo, 5th Duke of Fernán Núñez
 Manuel Falcó y Anchorena, 6th Duke of Fernán Núñez

Palace of Fernán Núñez

The ducal palace of Fernán Núñez was built in Fernán Núñez, Córdoba, between 1783 and 1787. It is one of the most important buildings of civil character in the province of Córdoba, declared an Asset of Cultural Interest in 1983. Of neoclassical architecture, it was built by the 6th Count of Fernán Núñez, during his time as ambassador in Portugal. The palace is inspired by the facade of the Necessidades Palace of the Portuguese capital, where the Spanish embassy was located at the time.

See also
List of dukes in the peerage of Spain
List of current Grandees of Spain

References

Bibliography
 

Spanish noble titles